Swindon Supermarine Football Club, a semi-professional association football club based in South Marston, Swindon, Wiltshire, England, was founded in 1992 as a merger between Supermarine and Swindon Athletic Football Clubs, both playing in the Hellenic Football League. Both clubs had problems, Supermarine finished bottom of Hellenic League Division One in the 1991–92 season and Swindon Athletic were having difficulties meeting the new ground grading requirements at their Swindon Borough Council owned Southbrook Recreation ground. So the two clubs agreed to merge and took Swindon Athletic's place in the Hellenic League Premier Division.

The new club won the Hellenic League Premier Division title on two occasions in their nine-season stay in the division. During their time in the Hellenic Football League, the club participated in the FA Vase each season; their furthest runs in the competition involved reaching the Second Round on two occasions in 1998–99 and 1999–2000.

In 2001 they joined the Southern Football League Division One West and became eligible to participate in the FA Cup, and in the FA Trophy instead of the FA Vase. At the end of the 2005–06 season the club took part in its first play-off tournament after finishing fifth in the Western Division; promotion was not achieved as they were eliminated in the semi-finals by Hemel Hempstead Town and were instead transferred to the newly formed Division One South & West. The club achieved immediate promotion from the new division after a fourth-place finish and subsequent play-off win, defeating Burnham in the semi-final and Taunton Town in the final. After four mid-table finishes in the Premier Division, Swindon Supermarine experienced relegation for the first time in their short history in 2011–12 finishing 21st of 22 and returning to Division One South & West. This division was renamed back to Division One West in 2017, and in 2018 the club were promoted into Premier Division South. Their best run in the FA Cup came in the 2010–11 season when they reached the Second Round proper where they lost at League One side Colchester United. This has been the only time the club has progressed through the qualifying rounds. Swindon Supermarine reached the Third Round proper (last sixteen) of the 2008–09 FA Trophy, their furthest run in the competition, where they lost to the holders Ebbsfleet United.

As at the end of 2018–19, the club's first team had spent six seasons in the seventh tier of English football, twelfth in the eighth tier and nine in the ninth tier. The table below details their achievements in first-team competitions for each completed season since their first appearance in the Hellenic Football League Premier Division in 1992–93.

Key

Key to divisions
 Hellenic Premier = Hellenic Football League Premier Division
 Southern Premier = Southern Football League Premier Division
 Southern Premier South = Southern Football League Premier Division South
 
 Southern Div 1 West = Southern Football League Division One West

Key to positions and symbols
  = Champions
  = Promoted
  = Relegated

Key to rounds
 = Not eligible to enter
EP = Extra preliminary round
PRE = Preliminary round
QR1 = First qualifying round, etc.
R1 = First round, etc.

Seasons

Notes

References

Seasons
Swindon Supermarine
Swindon Supermarine